NAC Architecture is a design firm with over 170 architects, engineers, interior designers and support staff, with offices in Spokane, Seattle and Los Angeles. The firm specializes in architecture, planning, electrical engineering, interior design, and capital facilities consulting. Core markets served include education (K-12 and higher education), healthcare, laboratory, biotechnology, recreation, hospitality, civic, cultural, extended care, and restoration.  Incorporated in 1970, NAC Architecture has roots in Spokane, Washington, dating back to 1960.

The firm has won over 230 design and industry awards in its history. In 2013, NAC Architecture was ranked 18th for sustainable design among architectural firms in the U.S. by ARCHITECT magazine, the official publication of the American Institute of Architects.  The firm was ranked 45th overall.

In 2011, Building Design and Construction Magazine ranked NAC Architecture 30th overall and 9th among U.S. K-12 school design firms in their Giants 300 Report.

Notable buildings 
Golden High School - Golden, Colorado
Silas High School - Tacoma, Washington
Shadle Park High School - Spokane, Washington    
Oak Harbor High School - Oak Harbor, Washington
University of Arizona Likins Hall and Arbol de la Vida Residence Halls - Tucson, Arizona
John R. Rogers High School - Spokane, Washington     
University of Colorado Colorado Springs Osborne Center for Science and Engineering - Colorado Springs, Colorado   
Glacier Peak High School - Snohomish, Washington
Joel E. Ferris High School - Spokane, Washington
Fox Theater - Spokane, Washington
Machias Elementary - Snohomish, Washington
Eisenhower High School (Yakima, Washington) - Yakima, Washington
Bellevue High School - Bellevue, Washington
Washington State University Northside Residence Hall - Pullman, Washington
Whitworth University East Residence Hall - Spokane, Washington
University of Idaho Student Recreation Center - Moscow, Idaho

References

External links
Company website

Architecture firms of the United States
Design companies established in 1979